Sanger is a city in Denton County, Texas, United States. The population was 6,916 at the 2010 census, and 8,839 at the 2020 census.

Geography

Sanger is located at  (33.363068, –97.176212).

The climate in this area is characterized by hot, humid summers and generally mild to cool winters.  According to the Köppen Climate Classification system, Sanger has a humid subtropical climate, abbreviated "Cfa" on climate maps.

Demographics

The population in 1980 was 2,574, an increase of 60.6% since 1970. In 1990, the population was 3,508, and the city's population in 2010 was 6,916. During the publication of the 2020 United States census, there were 8,839 people, 2,842 households, and 2,055 families residing in the city.

Economy
In 2022 the community did not have its own grocery store. It previously did, but after it closed, Sanger Independent School District created a charity grocery store for its own students.

Education

Public education in Sanger is run under the Sanger Independent School District (SISD), an independent government. The superintendent of the Sanger Public schools is Dr. Sandra McCoy-Jackson. There are eight different schools in Sanger, Texas. They are Sanger High School, Linda Tutt High School, Sanger Middle School, Sanger 6th Grade Campus, Clear Creek Intermediate School, Butterfield Elementary School, Chisholm Trail Elementary, and Tenderfoot Child Development Center. The new facilities in the Sanger Independent School district are one of the high schools and the new elementary school. The City of Sanger considers the school district a partner of the cities and they work very closely with one another. Sanger ISD has recently introduced a district wide initiative to integrate instructional technology with effective teaching practices. They currently have a 1:1 student technology lending program for grades 8–12 and have increased available technology in all grades across the district.

In 2022 about 20% of the residents in the town had a bachelor's degree.

Politics
In 2022 the majority of residents supported the Republican Party.

Notable people

 Dane Evans, American professional Canadian football quarterback for the Hamilton Tiger-Cats of the Canadian Football League (CFL) – studied at Sanger High School (Originally from Chickasha, Oklahoma)
 James F. Hollingsworth, United States Army lieutenant general – born in Sanger, Texas
 Ty O'Neal, American actor – currently lives in Sanger, Texas (Originally from Abilene, Texas)
 Jay Ramsey, American singer, songwriter, musician, and performer – grew up in Sanger, Texas and attended Sanger High School
 Lynn Stucky, American veterinarian and Republican member of the Texas House of Representatives
 Larry Tidwell, American college basketball coach – born in Sanger, Texas
 Marijohn Wilkin, American songwriter, famous in country music for writing a number of hits – born in Kemp, Texas and raised in Sanger, Texas

References

External links
 City of Sanger official website
 Sanger, Texas at City-data.com

Cities in Denton County, Texas
Cities in Texas
Dallas–Fort Worth metroplex
Populated places established in 1886